Gymnadenia is a genus of flowering plants in the orchid family (Orchidaceae) containing 22 terrestrial species. The former genus Nigritella is now included in Gymnadenia.

They can be found in damp meadows, fens and marshes, and on chalk or limestone, often in alpine regions of Europe and Asia from Portugal to Kamchatka, including China, Japan, Mongolia, Siberia, the Himalayas, Iran, Ukraine, Germany, Scandinavia, Great Britain, etc. The fragrant orchid (Gymnadenia conopsea) has been introduced into the USA and is reportedly naturalized in Connecticut.

These hardy terrestrial orchids are deciduous. They survive the winter through two deep-cut tubers. Long lanceolate green leaves grow at the bottom of the stem. There are some small leaves at the stop of the stem.

They flower during the summer. The inflorescence is a dense cylindrical spike between 5 and 30 cm long. It can consists of up to 150 small pleasant-smelling flowers. It is recently discovered that eugenol and isoeugenol, floral volatile scent compounds, are catalyzed by single type of enzyme in Gymnadenia species and gene encoding for this enzyme is first functionally characterized gene in this species so far. Their color can vary from pale purple to pink and white. The lip is wide with three lobes. The marginal petals are horizontal. There is a long, thin, threadlike spur.

Several species were formerly classified under Nigritella. The nothogeneric name ×Gymnigritella was used for hybrids between these two groups.

Species 

, Plants of the World Online accepted the following species and hybrids. ([N] = formerly placed in Nigritella, [GN] = formerly placed in ×Gymnigritella.)
Gymnadenia archiducis-joannis (Teppner & E.Klein) Teppner & E.Klein [N] – Austria
Gymnadenia austriaca (Teppner & E.Klein) P.Delforge [N] – C. Europe to Pyrenees
Gymnadenia bicolor (W.Foelsche) W.Foelsche & O.Gerbaud
Gymnadenia bicornis Tang & K.Y.Lang – Tibet
Gymnadenia borealis (Druce) R.M.Bateman, Pridgeon & M.W.Chase
Gymnadenia buschmanniae (Teppner & Ster) Teppner & E.Klein [N] – Italy
Gymnadenia carpatica (Zapal.) Teppner & E.Klein [N] – E. Carpathians
Gymnadenia conopsea (L.) R.Br. –  fragrant orchid, Europe to Temp. E. Asia
Gymnadenia corneliana (Beauverd) Teppner & E.Klein – SW. Alps
Gymnadenia crassinervis Finet – China
Gymnadenia densiflora (Wahlenb.) A.Dietr.
Gymnadenia dolomitensis Teppner & E.Klein [N] – S. Alps
Gymnadenia emeiensis K.Y.Lang – China (Sichuan)
Gymnadenia frivaldii Hampe ex Griseb. – Balkan Pen. to S. Carpathians
Gymnadenia gabasiana (Teppner & E.Klein) Teppner & E.Klein [N] – Pyrenees
Gymnadenia hygrophila (W.Foelsche & Heidtke) W.Foelsche, Heidtke & O.Gerbaud
Gymnadenia lithopolitanica (Ravnik) Teppner & E.Klein [N] – SE. Alps
Gymnadenia miniata (Crantz) Hayek
Gymnadenia nigra (L.) Rchb.f. [N] – Europe, Israel
Gymnadenia odoratissima (L.) Rich. – Europe
Gymnadenia orchidis Lindl. – Himalaya to China
Gymnadenia rhellicani (Teppner & E.Klein) Teppner & E.Klein [N] – W. Alps
Gymnadenia runei (Teppner & E.Klein) Ericsson – Sweden
Gymnadenia stiriaca (Rech.) Teppner & E.Klein
Gymnadenia taquetii Schltr. – Korea
Gymnadenia widderi (Teppner & E.Klein) Teppner & E.Klein [N] – NE. Alps, C. Italy

Hybrids
Gymnadenia × abelii (Asch. & Graebn.) J.M.H.Shaw
Gymnadenia × borisii Stoj., Stef. & T.Georgiev
Gymnadenia × chanousiana G.Foelsche & W.Foelsche (G. rhellicani × G. conopsea) [GN] – France
Gymnadenia × delphineae (M.Gerbaud & O.Gerbaud) M.Gerbaud & O.Gerbaud (G. corneliana × G. rhellicani) GN) – France
Gymnadenia × eggeriana O.Gerbaud (G. austriaca var. gallica × G. rhellicani) [N] – France
Gymnadenia × fohringeri (Griebl) J.M.H.Shaw
Gymnadenia × geigelsteiniana (B.Baumann & H.Baumann) J.M.H.Shaw
Gymnadenia × godferyana (G.Keller) W.Foelsche (G. conopsea × G. rubra) [GN] – Alps
Gymnadenia × hedrenii (W.Foelsche) J.M.H.Shaw
Gymnadenia × heufleri (A.Kern.) Wettst. – Alps
Gymnadenia × hubertii (Griebl) J.M.H.Shaw
Gymnadenia × intermedia Peterm. – Europe
Gymnadenia × kaeseri (Braun-Blanq.) Oddone
Gymnadenia × moritziana (Brügger ex Nyman) Oddone
Gymnadenia × petzenensis (F.Fohringer & Redl) Oddone
Gymnadenia × pyrenaeensis W.Foelsche [GN] – Pyrenees
Gymnadenia × schwerei (G.Keller) J.M.H.Shaw
Gymnadenia × teppneri (W.Foelsche) Oddone
Gymnadenia × trummeriana (W.Foelsche) J.M.H.Shaw
Gymnadenia × truongiae (Demares) W.Foelsche (G. conopsea × G. corneliana) [GN] – France
Gymnadenia × turnowskyi (W.Foelsche) W.Foelsche (G. conopsea × G. lithopolitanica) [GN] – Austria
Gymnadenia × wettsteiniana O.Abel [N] – Alps

Further reading
 Delforge, P. 1998. Contribution taxonomique et nomenclaturale au genre Gymnadenia (Orchidaceae). Nomenclatural and taxonomical contribution to the genus Gymnadenia (Orchidaceae). Nat. Belg. 79(4): 251–256.

In Literature 
Gymnadenia is the title of a novel published in 1929 in Norwegian by Nobel Prize winning author Sigrid Undset. The novel was translated into English by Arthur G. Chater and published in 1931 as The Wild Orchid.

Notes

References

External links 
 
 

 
Orchideae genera